Damian Paul Chopa (born 28 November 1986) is a Tanzanian long-distance runner who specializes in the 5000 metres and cross-country running.

Achievements

Personal bests
800 metres - 1:50.19 min (2004)
1500 metres - 3:43.4 min (2003)
5000 metres - 13:24.03 min (2006)

External links

1986 births
Living people
Tanzanian male long-distance runners
Athletes (track and field) at the 2006 Commonwealth Games
Commonwealth Games competitors for Tanzania